Charles Brewer-Carías (born 10 September 1938 in Caracas, Venezuela) is a Venezuelan explorer and naturalist. Known as the "Humboldt of the twentieth century", Brewer-Carías has led more than 200 expeditions to remote parts of the Venezuelan Guayana, particularly the tepuis (table mountains) of the region. His discoveries include the sink holes of Cerro Sarisariñama and the world's largest known quartzite cave, Cueva Charles Brewer.

Around 27 species of animals and plants have been named in his honour, including the bromeliad genus Brewcaria.

See also
Napoleon Chagnon
Jacques Lizot 
 Julian A. Steyermark
 Otto Huber (ecologist)

References

External links
 Official website
 Dr Charles Brewer, UBC Venezuela

1938 births
Living people
Venezuelan explorers
Venezuelan naturalists
Plant collectors
Venezuelan people of British descent